Cychrus bisetosus is a species of ground beetle in the subfamily of Carabinae that is endemic to Sichuan, province of China. It was described by Deuve in 1995.

References

bisetosus
Beetles described in 1995
Endemic fauna of Sichuan
Beetles of Asia